The Spicer Islands are an uninhabited island group located in Foxe Basin, within Qikiqtaaluk Region, in the Canadian territory of Nunavut. The Melville Peninsula is to the west, Prince Charles Island to the east, Rowley Island to the north. The two main islands are North Spicer Island and South Spicer Island. They are very low-lying and swampy.

Another set of (smaller) Spicer Islands lies off the south coast of Baffin Island, in Hudson's Strait, near Wharton Harbour and Chudliasi Bay.

References

External links 
 Spicer Islands in the Atlas of Canada - Toporama; Natural Resources Canada
 Spicer Islands (Hudson's Strait) in the Atlas of Canada - Toporama; Natural Resources Canada

Uninhabited islands of Qikiqtaaluk Region